Melinda Czink was the defending champion, but decided not to participate this year.

Tamira Paszek won the title, defeating Bethanie Mattek-Sands 7–6(8–6), 2–6, 7–5 in the final.

Seeds

Draw

Finals

Top half

Bottom half

References
Main Draw
Qualifying Draw

Challenge Bell
Tournoi de Québec
Can